The 1933–34 Illinois Fighting Illini men's basketball team represented the University of Illinois.

Regular season
Craig Ruby entered the 1933–34 season as the winningest coach in the history at the University of Illinois with 96 wins.  Ruby had 10 returning lettermen from a team that had finished tied for fifth place in the Big Ten the year before.  For the third season in a row, the team went through a nearly perfect non-conference season, losing only 1 game, however, the Fighting Illini showed no improvement in conference play by finishing with a record of 7 wins and 5 losses. The team finished the season with an overall record of 11 wins 7 losses.  The starting lineup included captain Hudson Hellmich at center, Jack Benyon and Albert Kamm at guard, with Fred Fencl and Alfred Kamm as forwards.

Roster

Source

Schedule

|-	
!colspan=12 style="background:#DF4E38; color:white;"| Non-Conference regular season
|- align="center" bgcolor=""

|-	
!colspan=9 style="background:#DF4E38; color:#FFFFFF;"|Big Ten regular season

Bold Italic connotes conference game
												
Source

Awards and honors

References

Illinois Fighting Illini
Illinois Fighting Illini men's basketball seasons
1934 in sports in Illinois
1935 in sports in Illinois